The Bay Strikes Back was a concert tour featuring Bay Area thrash metal bands Testament, Exodus and Death Angel. The first leg of the tour took place in Europe from February 6, 2020, to March 11, 2020. Death Angel was promoting their ninth album Humanicide, while the tour predated the release of Testament's thirteenth studio album Titans of Creation by around two months. Other than two shows in Northern California in October and November 2021, the European leg of The Bay Strikes Back tour was the last tour that drummer Gene Hoglan did with Testament before he left the band in January 2022.

A North American leg of The Bay Strikes Back tour took place in April and May 2022. This was Testament's first major US tour since the release of Titans of Creation in April 2020, and it also saw Exodus touring to support their eleventh studio album Persona Non Grata, while Death Angel continued touring behind Humanicide. The North American leg of The Bay Strikes Back tour was also Testament's first major tour with onetime drummer Dave Lombardo, who replaced Hoglan in March 2022. Another European leg took place in the summer of 2022, followed by a second North American leg in the fall.

Tour dates

Cancelled shows

References

2020 concert tours
2021 concert tours
2022 concert tours
Death Angel concert tours
Exodus (American band) concert tours
Testament (band) concert tours